Critica marxista is a political magazine published in Rome, Italy. Founded in 1963 it is one of the earliest political periodicals in the country.

History and profile
Critica marxista was launched in 1963. It was started by Italian Communist Party (PCI) as a theoretical journal. The founding editors were Luigi Longo, Alessandro Natta and Emilio Sereni. Until 1992 the magazine remained as a publication of the PCI. The PCI were planning to close down the publication, but a group of Italian intellectuals led by Aldo Tortorella and Aldo Zanardo bought it. The magazine covers analyses and contributions to rethink the leftist politics. It has been published on a bimonthly basis by Editori Riuniti from its start. The headquarters is in Rome.

Leading contributors of Critica marxista include Louis Althusser, Nicola Badaloni, Franco Cassano, Umberto Cerroni, Biagio De Giovanni, Cesare Luporini, Giacomo Marramao, Giuseppe Prestipino, Silvano Tagliagambe, Edoardo Sanguineti, Luciano Canfora, Mario Tronti and Giuseppe Vacca.

References

External links

1963 establishments in Italy
Bi-monthly magazines published in Italy
Italian-language magazines
Magazines established in 1963
Magazines published in Rome
Marxist magazines
Political magazines published in Italy